The Claireville Conservation Area is a suburban conservation area located on the border of Peel Region and Toronto in Ontario, Canada. The major part of the area is located in Brampton. The park is a 343 hectare (848 acre) parcel of conservation land located on the west branch of the Humber River. It is one of the largest tracts of land owned by the Toronto and Region Conservation Authority (TRCA). Claireville contains significant natural and cultural heritage features, and has recreation, tourism, and educational facilities and programs.

History 
The Area was acquired in 1957 to construct a flood control dam and reservoir after the destruction caused by Hurricane Hazel.

In 2003, in partnership with HSBC Bank, a contributor to the TRCA foundation, 150 volunteers planted over 850 new trees and shrubs in the area, creating 7.5 hectares (18.5 acres) of forest.

The TRCA has declared an early 20th-century farmhouse in the northern part of Claireville as a heritage property; major restoration began in 2005.

Landscape 

The park is a favorite with local dog owners, bird watchers and wildlife photographers. The landscape of the park is diverse. Its characteristic features are numerous creeks and ravines, flat plains, and rolling hills enriching the forested landscape.

A multi-year natural area enhancement plan has been developed for Claireville. Some of the recommended activities of this plan include:
Protecting and enhancing significant blocks of interior forest habitat and reforestation.
Enhancing public use and access to internal trail network and installing wildlife structures such as nest boxes for waterfowl and song birds; brush piles for small mammals; and in-water structural habitats like stumps, logs, and rocks for a variety of fish.

Fauna 
The park is home to the eastern coyote, wood duck, chimney crayfish, deer, muskrat, and common garter snake. The park's varied landscape can be admired from many vantage points.

Birds

Dozens of bird species can be seen. Some use the park as a stop on their migratory route, while others breed in the park.

In open fields
Eastern meadowlark
Red-winged blackbird
Bobolink
American woodcock
Savannah sparrow

In the forest
Rose-breasted grosbeak
Pileated woodpecker
Red-eyed vireo
Blue jay
American robin
Great-crested flycatcher
Hairy woodpecker
Scarlet tanager

Semi-Open brush
Northern oriole
Eastern kingbird
Field sparrow
House wren
Yellow shafted flicker
Indigo bunting
Grey catbird
Brown thrasher

Ponds, marshes, river banks
Wood duck
Tree swallow
Mallard
Song sparrow
Bank swallow
Rough-wing swallow
Eastern phoebe
Cliff swallow

Fish 
Common year round are: brown bullhead, carp, creek chub, goldfish, largemouth bass, pumpkinseed, rock bass and white sucker. The seasonal species include yellow perch and amphibians.

Rare white deer
There have been sightings of a rare white deer. These are not albino deer, but rather a product of a recessive gene in some species of deer. In this case it is a white, white-tail deer. These white deer can vary in their percentage of white, with freckles or mottling in many patterns. They sometimes have deformed feet and ankles but otherwise exist within the herd as normal deer. Offspring can be of normal colouring or sometimes demonstrate the recessive gene.

Location 

Parking is available at the east and north gates, and at the HSBC forest area. The south gate is located on Gorewood Dr, while the east gate is on Regional Road 50 just north of Steeles Avenue (the Etobicoke Field Studies Centre is just a short walk from this gate). The north entrance is located at the intersection of McVean Dr. and Regional Road 107 (the Claireville Ranch entrance). The northernmost area of the park is the HSBC forest; it is located on McVean Dr. 1 km north of Queen Street.

Facilities 
The Etobicoke Field Studies Centre is located in the southern corner of Claireville and provides programs for student from Grade 1 to Grade 6. Located in the northern corner of the park is the Claireville Ranch, which provides horse riding lessons, trail riding and other group activities. The Indian Line Campground, a family campground, is located in the Brampton section of the park. It offers 245 serviced and unserviced campsites.

References

External links

Conservation areas in Ontario
Geography of Brampton
Protected areas of the Regional Municipality of Peel
Tourist attractions in Brampton